Ganguly may refer to:

 Ganguly (surname), including a list of people with the name

Places
 Gangolli, Kundapura taluk of Udupi, India
 Gangolihat, Kumaon region, Uttarakhand, India